Garth Derick Wright  (born 9 September 1963) is a former South African rugby union player.

Playing career
Wright played for Eastern Province and Transvaal in the South African domestic competitions. He made his test debut for the Springboks in the third test against the visiting New Zealand Cavaliers team on 24 May 1986 at Loftus Versfeld in Pretoria. Wright scored his first and only test try in his second test, the fourth test against the Cavaliers. He was capped 7 times and scored 1 try for the Springboks and also played a further five tour matches.

Test history

See also
List of South Africa national rugby union players – Springbok no. 548

References

1963 births
Living people
Rugby union players from East London, Eastern Cape
South Africa international rugby union players
South African people of British descent
South African rugby union players
White South African people
Rugby union scrum-halves
Eastern Province Elephants players
Golden Lions players